is a district along the Nigawa (river), which flows along the border of Takarazuka and Nishinomiya, in Hyōgo Prefecture, Japan.

Outline

Nigawa is one of the districts developed in the early stages of the development of the area along the Hankyu Imazu Line in the 1930s. This beautiful district has also been well known as a district where rich people, including presidents of major companies, sport managers and players, artists, or university professors in the Osaka Metropolitan Area live. However, during the Great Hanshin earthquake in 1995, this district was heavily damaged and the aging of the population has started to change the atmosphere around the district.

Blocks

Nigawa district consists of the blocks as follows;

Nishinomiya City
Nigawa 1-chome, 2-chome, 3-chome, 4-chome, 5-chome, 6-chome (仁川○丁目)
Nigawa-cho (仁川町)
Nigawa Gokayama-cho (仁川五ヶ山町)
Nigawa Yurino-cho (仁川百合野町)
Takarazuka City
Nigawa Kita 1 chome, 2 chome, 3 chome (仁川北○丁目)
Nigawa Takadai 1-chome, 2-chome (仁川高台○丁目)
Nigawa Takamaru 1-chome, 2-chome, 3-chome (仁川高丸○丁目)
Nigawa Tsukimigaoka (仁川月見ヶ丘)
Nigawa-dai (仁川台)
Nigawa Asahigaoka (仁川旭ヶ丘)
Nigawa-danchi (仁川団地)
Nigawa Miyanishi-cho (仁川宮西町)

Attractions

Hanshin Racecourse – Near Nigawa but just outside of the district
Bentenike Pond
Mount Kabutoyama
Kabutoyama Forest Park

Shopping

Sarara Nigawa
OASIS Hankyu

Education

Takarazuka Daiichi Junior High School
Nigawa Elementary School
Nigawa Kindergarten (Takarazuka)
Nigawa Kindergarten (Nishinomiya)
Kurumi Kindergarten

Access

Nigawa Station

Gallery

See also
Nigawa landslide

References
Takarazuka City Map
Takarazuka City Home Page
Arikawa Hiroshi, Hankyu Densha, Tokyo:Gentosha, 2008

Shopping districts and streets in Japan
Tourist attractions in Hyōgo Prefecture
Geography of Hyōgo Prefecture